Dariush Mozaffarian (born August 19, 1969) is a cardiologist, Special Advisor to the Provost, Dean for Policy, and Jean Mayer Professor at the Gerald J. and Dorothy R. Friedman School of Nutrition Science and Policy at Tufts University. He is also Professor of Medicine at Tufts University School of Medicine. Dr. Mozaffarian has stepped away from his role as Dean of the Friedman School for the 2022-23 academic year, returning on July 1, 2023, to focus on the translation and dissemination of scientific evidence into public awareness, policy, and innovation, including work to help inform the White House Conference on Hunger, Nutrition, and Health.

Mozaffarian is the author of over 450 scientific publications and has served as an adviser for the US and Canadian governments, American Heart Association, World Health Organization, and the United Nations.

Education
Mozaffarian received a BS in biological sciences at Stanford University (Phi Beta Kappa) and MD at Columbia University (Alpha Omega Alpha). He took his residency at Stanford, and was a fellow in cardiovascular medicine at the University of Washington, where he also received his MPH. He earned a Doctorate in Public Health from Harvard.

Academic career
Mozaffarian joined the faculty of the Harvard School of Public Health (HSPH) in 2006, where he later founded the school's program in Cardiovascular Epidemiology. From 2004 to 2007, he served as an adjunct faculty member at the Tufts University School of Medicine. Mozaffarian was an associate professor at HSPH, as well as an associate professor in the Division of Cardiovascular Medicine at Harvard Medical School and Brigham and Women’s Hospital.

On July 1, 2014, Mozaffarian became the Dean of Tufts University's Gerald J. and Dorothy R. Friedman School of Nutrition Science and Policy. He is the Jean Mayer Professor of Nutrition, and Professor of Medicine at Tufts University School of Medicine.

Research
Mozaffarian is the author of over 450 scientific publications on dietary priorities for obesity, diabetes, and cardiovascular diseases, and on evidence-based policy approaches and innovations to reduce these burdens in the US and globally. Mozaffarian is the principal investigator of the Global Dietary Database, and Food-PRICE (Policy Review and Intervention Cost-Effectiveness). As well, he was selected to serve on advisory boards for the US and Canadian governments, American Heart Association, World Health Organization, and the United Nations.

In 2011, Mozaffarian published a study which found that the quality of one's diet is strongly associated with weight gain. The study also found that out of all the foods examined, potato chips were most strongly associated with weight gain. In 2014, Mozaffarian co-authored a controversial meta-analysis pertaining to the association between saturated fat consumption and risk of heart disease. Despite the meta-analysis's conclusion that the evidence "does not clearly support guidelines that encourage high consumption of polyunsaturated fatty acids and low consumption of total saturated fats," Mozaffarian told Science Insider that "Personally, I think the results suggest that fish and vegetable oils should be encouraged." In a 2018 paper published in the BMJ, Mozaffarian and co-author Nita G. Forouhi argued that "Nutrition science has often been criticized as unreliable, but has made vital contributions to human health" and that going forward, "All stakeholders, including the food industry, must be part of a collective effort to solve the tremendous global challenge of nutrition and health."

Honors and awards
In 2016, Thomson Reuters named Mozaffarian as one of the World's Most Influential Scientific Minds. In 2018, Mozaffarian was awarded the Chanchlani Global Health Research Award by McMaster University. That same year, he was awarded the Walker Prize by the Museum of Science, Boston and was a Presidential Symposium Speaker for the American Society for Nutrition.

Public impact
Mozaffarian has been active in the Friedman School's Public Impact Initiatives, including Food is Medicine, and has participated in the bipartisan sponsored working group.

In January 2018, while on Capitol Hill to show his support for the launch of a Food Is Medicine Working Group within Congress’s House Hunger Caucus, he stated, “As a cardiologist, I’ve been thinking about food—and how food is missing from the health-care system—for twenty years now.....One in four dollars in the federal budget is spent on health care. One in five dollars in the entire U.S. economy is spent on health care, and that is only going to go up until we address food."

Dr. Mozaffarian has brought together several national coalitions to address major scientific and policy issues around food, nutrition, and agriculture, such as the 50th Anniversary of the White House Conference on Food, Nutrition, and Health, the white paper and coalition on Strengthening Federal Nutrition Research; and diverse nonprofits and businesses in the Food & Nutrition Innovation Council.  He has worked closely with Congress and other stakeholders to help advance bipartisan priorities around advancing science and innovation, improving nutrition security, reducing diet-related healthcare expenditures, and addressing corresponding racial, income, and geographic-related inequities.

Personal life
Mozaffarian and his wife have three children together. He also trains as a Third Degree Black Belt in Taekwondo.

Selected publications

References

External links

Tufts University faculty
American cardiologists
Living people
American public health doctors
Harvard School of Public Health faculty
Stanford University alumni
University of Washington School of Public Health alumni
Columbia University Vagelos College of Physicians and Surgeons alumni
Harvard School of Public Health alumni
1969 births